Land of Dreams is a 2021 American comedy film directed by Shoja Azari and Shirin Neshat and starring Sheila Vand, which premiered at the Orizzonti Extra programme of the 78th Venice Film Festival in 2021. It is shot from one of the last scripts written by French scriptwriter Jean-Claude Carrière.

Cast
Sheila Vand as Simin
Matt Dillon as Alan
William Moseley as Mark
Isabella Rossellini as Jane
Christopher McDonald as Blair
Anna Gunn as Nancy
Robin Bartlett as Jackie
Gaius Charles as David
Nicole Ansari-Cox as Simin's Mother
Mohammad B. Ghaffari as Hirsute Man

Reception
Lovia Gyarkye of The Hollywood Reporter gave the film a positive review and wrote, "It’s a witty and thrilling take on American culture that benefits from its creators’ immigrant experiences and inventive style."

Xan Brooks of The Guardian awarded the film two stars out of five and wrote, "...colourful, eccentric and flimsy, not quite fit for purpose; a film to weigh up for a moment and then set back on the stall."

References

External links